Carpathonesticus hungaricus  is a species of araneomorph spider of the family Nesticidae. It occurs in Romania, where it inhabits caves.

Description
Females have a pale yellowish prosoma with a blackish pattern that in some specimens is absent, and the sternum and appendages are a pale, reddish yellow. The prosoma has a length of 1.62.2 mm (1.9 mm in males). The opisthosoma is grey with a blackish pattern that is absent in some specimens.

Original publication

References 

Nesticidae
Spiders described in 1894
Spiders of Europe